Howard Lee "Whitey" Woodin (January 29, 1894 – February 7, 1974) was an American football player. He played with the Racine Legion and the Green Bay Packers and was inducted into the Green Bay Packers Hall of Fame in 1973. After retiring from football, Woodin remained in Green Bay and worked for many years at Falls Power and Paper Company.

External links
Woodin item from Hoard Historical Museum
http://www.pro-football-reference.com/players/W/WoodWh20.htm

1894 births
1974 deaths
People from Fort Atkinson, Wisconsin
Sportspeople from Green Bay, Wisconsin
Players of American football from Wisconsin
American football guards
Marquette Golden Avalanche football players
Green Bay Packers players